Tainan City F.C., for sponsorship reasons currently known as Taiwan Steel, is a Taiwanese professional football club which currently competes in the Taiwan Football Premier League.

History
The team joined the Taiwan Football Premier League, under the name Tainan City F.C. in 2017, which most of the players came from Tianmu Campus, University of Taipei, and was supported by Tainan City Government. The team structure and its players changed, since Taiwan Steel Group acquired the club and renamed it in 2019, importing national team players such as Wu Chun-ching.

Ahead of the 2020 season, Taiwan Steel Group added national team goalkeeper Pan Wen-chieh, defender Chen Wei-chuan, 2019 MVP Marc Fenelus, and 2019 Top Scorer Benchy Estama.

They won national league in 2020. In 2021, they played the AFC Cup for the first time.

Current squad

Continental record

References

Football clubs in Taiwan
Works association football clubs in Taiwan